Phyllonorycter clepsiphaga is a moth of the family Gracillariidae. It is known from Assam and Meghalaya, India.

The host plant is unknown, but the larvae make a blotch mine on the upperside of the leaf.

References

clepsiphaga
Moths of Asia
Moths described in 1922